Jonathan Harboe (born 24 May 2000) is a Danish footballer who plays as a midfielder.

Youth career 
Harboe was raised in the small Danish club Sanderum located in Odense. In the age of 13, Harboe went to Odense Boldklub's youth academy.

Club career

OB 

On 24 May 2018, the day he turned 18, he signed his first professional contract. A three-year deal with Odense Boldklub. The club confirmed on 22 May 2020, that Harboe's contract had been terminated by mutual consent.

References

External links
 

2000 births
Living people
Danish men's footballers
Association football midfielders
Danish Superliga players
Odense Boldklub players
Footballers from Odense